Intelsat 22, is a communications satellite in geostationary orbit and constructed by Boeing Space Systems for the Intelsat Corporation. The satellite was planned to be located at 72° East Longitude over the Indian Ocean.

The Australian Defence Force (ADF) signed a US$167 million contract with Intelsat for the UHF payload on the Intelsat 22 satellite for 15 years of service.

Communications payloads 
Intelsat 22 had three distinct communications payloads. A 48 channel C-band payload with 36 MHz channels, a 24 channel Ku-band payload with 36 MHz channels, and an 18 channel Ultra high frequency (UHF) payload with 25 kHz channels.

C-band payload 
The Intelsat 24 C-band payload consists of 48 operational 36 MHz channels. Two antennas provide service to the Africa and Asia regions. There is some cross connect capability between the two regions.

Ku-band payload 
The Intelsat 18 Ku-band payload consists of 24 operational 36 MHz channels with coverage for the Middle East, Africa, and Europe.

UHF payload 
The UHF payload consists of 18 operational 25 kHz channels which were added to the Intelsat 22 satellite as a result of the contract with ADF (Australia).

Launch 
Intelsat 22 was launched on 25 March 2012 at 12:10:32 UTC.

References 

Intelsat satellites
Satellites using the BSS-702 bus
Communications satellites in geostationary orbit
Spacecraft launched in 2012